The year 1870 in archaeology involved some significant events.

Explorations

Excavations
 In Athens, Greece, the site of Kallimarmaron Stadium is excavated (later rebuilt to host the first modern olympics in 1896).
 In France, of the Grottes prehistoriques de Soyons (caves), the Trou du Mouton (Sheep's hole), Trou Roland, la Madeleine, and Trou du Renard (fox hole) are excavated by Lepic and De Lubac.

Finds
 Spring – Torslunda plates discovered in Öland.
 First discoveries of the Polada culture.

Institutions 
 National Archaeological Museum (Florence) inaugurated.

Publications
 Abraham de la Pryme (1671–1704) – The diary of Abraham de la Pryme, the Yorkshire antiquary. Publications of the Surtees Society, volume 54. Durham: Andrews and Company.

Births
 Antonios Keramopoulos, Greek archaeologist (d. 1960)

Deaths
 January 24 – John Howard Marsden, English archaeologist (b. 1803)

See also
Ancient Egypt / Egyptology

References

Archaeology
Archaeology by year
Archaeology
Archaeology